The Queens Community Board 3  is a local government in New York City, encompassing the neighborhoods of Jackson Heights, East Elmhurst and North Corona, as well as LaGuardia Airport, in the borough of Queens. It is delimited by the Brooklyn-Queens Expressway to the west, the Grand Central Parkway to the north, Flushing Meadows Corona Park on the east, and Roosevelt Avenue on the south.

References

External links
Profile of the Community Board

Community boards of Queens